When Engineering Fails is a 1998 film written and presented by Henry Petroski. It examines the causes of major disasters, including the explosion of the Space Shuttle Challenger, and compares the risks of computer-assisted design with those of traditional engineering methods.  The original title of the film was To Engineer Is Human, the title of Petroski's non-fiction book about design failures.

References 

1998 films
Documentary films about technology
1998 documentary films
American documentary films
Mechanical failure
1990s American films